The men's Greco-Roman bantamweight competition at the 1932 Summer Olympics in Los Angeles took place from 4 August to 7 August at the Grand Olympic Auditorium. Nations were limited to one competitor. This weight class was limited to wrestlers weighing up to 56kg.

This Greco-Roman wrestling competition followed the same format that was introduced at the 1928 Summer Olympics, using an elimination system based on the accumulation of points. Each round featured all wrestlers pairing off and wrestling one bout (with one wrestler having a bye if there were an odd number). The loser received 3 points. The winner received 1 point if the win was by decision and 0 points if the win was by fall. At the end of each round, any wrestler with at least 5 points was eliminated.

Schedule

Results

Round 1

Three wrestlers finished the round with 0 points. One had 1 point. Three had 3 points.

 Bouts

 Points

Round 2

Nizzola had a bye, maintaining his 0 point total. Brendel received his first point by winning by decision. Thuvesson's second consecutive win by decision gave him a total of 2 points. Zervinis's first bout (after a bye) was a loss, resulting in 3 points. François won by decision, adding 1 points to his previous 3 for a total of 4. Jaskari and Szekfü, losers in both the first two rounds, were eliminated. 

 Bouts

 Points

Round 3

Nizzola's perfect score ended with a win by decision and 1 point. Brendel's third win and second by decision gave him a total of 2 points. François had a bye, staying on 4 points. Zervinis (0–2 after a bye) and Thuvesson (2–1, but both wins by decision) were eliminated.

 Bouts

 Points

Round 4

François defeated Nizzola in the only bout this round, but the winner (starting at 4 points and earning 1 due to winning by decision) was eliminated and the loser (who had made it three prior rounds with only 1 point) was not. François finished with the bronze medal, while Nizzola advanced to face Brendel (who had a bye in this round) in the final.

 Bouts

 Points

Final round

Nizzola "gave up [the] contest" according to the Official Report. However, he was apparently dissatisfied with the result and "attacked Brendel with a knife, with a policeman intervening to prevent any serious injuries."

 Bouts

 Points

References

Wrestling at the 1932 Summer Olympics